Gustavo César Veloso (born January 29, 1980, in Vilagarcía de Arousa) is a Spanish professional road bicycle racer, who currently rides for UCI Continental team .

Major results

2003
 1st  Overall Prémio Grande Porto
1st Stage 2
 1st Klasika Primavera
 8th Overall Tour de l'Avenir
2004
 3rd Clásica a los Puertos de Guadarrama
2005
 9th Overall Vuelta a Aragón
2006
 1st Stage 5 Volta a Portugal
 7th Overall Vuelta a Castilla y León
 7th Overall Volta ao Alentejo
2008
 1st  Overall Volta a Catalunya
 3rd Overall Tour de Langkawi
 4th Overall Tour of Turkey
 10th Overall Volta ao Distrito de Santarém
2009
 1st Stage 9 Vuelta a España
 4th Overall Tour of Turkey
2013
 2nd Overall Volta a Portugal
1st Stage 8
 2nd Overall Tour do Rio
2014
 1st  Overall Volta a Portugal
1st Stage 9 (ITT)
 2nd Overall Tour do Rio
2015
 1st  Overall Volta a Portugal
1st  Points classification
1st Stages 6 & 9 (ITT)
 1st  Overall Tour do Rio
1st Stage 2
2016
 2nd Overall Volta a Portugal
1st  Points classification
1st Stages 4, 6 & 10 (ITT)
 7th Overall Troféu Joaquim Agostinho
1st Stage 3
2017
 Volta a Portugal
1st Stages 5 & 10 (ITT)
2018
 1st Stage 5 (ITT) Volta ao Alentejo
 6th Clássica Aldeias do Xisto
 6th Klasika Primavera
2019
 3rd Overall Volta a Portugal
 5th Overall Troféu Joaquim Agostinho
1st Prologue
2020
 2nd Overall Volta a Portugal
1st Prologue & Stage 8 (ITT)

References

External links 

1980 births
Living people
Sportspeople from Vilagarcía de Arousa
Cyclists from Galicia (Spain)
Spanish Vuelta a España stage winners
Spanish male cyclists
Volta a Portugal winners